Brezinaite, discovered in 1969, is a rare mineral composed of chromium and sulfur. It is found in meteorites, such as the Tucson Ring meteorite (Irwin-Ainsa meteorite), its type locality. It was also found in the New Baltimore meteorite and the Sikhote-Alin meteorite. Brezinaite was named in honour of Aristides Brezina (1848–1909), a past director of the Mineralogy-Petrology Section of the Natural History Museum, Vienna, Austria.

References

Chromium minerals
Sulfide minerals
Meteorite minerals
Monoclinic minerals
Minerals in space group 12